The Grob G 115 is a general aviation fixed-wing aircraft, primarily used for flight training. It is built in Germany by Grob Aircraft (Grob Aerospace before January 2009). The E variant with a 3-blade variable pitch propeller is in service with the Finnish Air Force, the Royal Navy and Army Air Corps for Flying Grading (a pre-EFT flying course) and in the Royal Air Force as part of No. 6 Flying Training School (6 FTS) which provides flying to both University Air Squadrons and Air Experience Flights to Cadets of the Royal Air Force Air Cadets. As of 2020, the Tutor is still being used by the RAF for some Elementary Flying Training (3FTS) but is due to be phased out in favour of its replacement, the Prefect T1.

Design
The aircraft is constructed of carbon composite materials. The main fuselage and each wing spar is a single piece. It has a fixed (sprung steel) tricycle undercarriage with spatted wheels, a short nose bearing the 180 hp engine, and a 3-bladed variable-pitch propeller. The aircraft was re-certified in 2013 with a new MT Propeller following issues with the previous design. The inverted oil system was also redesigned to improve lubrication during aerobatics. The cockpit features a broad canopy arch and spine. Forward visibility is good. The side-by-side seats are fixed and pilot seating is adjusted with cushions as well as a rudder bar adjuster. The wings are tapered with square tips and the empennage consists of a large fin and rudder, with an oblong tailplane with square tips mid-set to the fuselage.

The initial Grob G 115 and G 115A models had an upright fin and rudder, and were mainly sold to civilian aeroplane clubs in Germany, the United Kingdom and several other countries.

The aircraft is capable of basic aerobatic manoeuvres (limited to  +6G and −3G).

Grob 115D2 (Heron)
The Grob Heron was first bought by the Royal Navy. After its use five were bought by Tayside Aviation. There are only six recorded Herons in existence; two (to be sold) operated by Tayside Aviation, three privately owned and one in Germany. One was reported as written off after an accident.

Grob 115E (Tutor)
With the retirement of the Scottish Aviation Bulldog T.1 from Royal Air Force University Air Squadrons (UASs) and Air Experience Flights (AEFs), a new system was put in place for the provision of the UAS and AEF flying tasks. Aircraft were to be owned and operated by private industry, contracted to the Ministry of Defence (MoD). The aircraft chosen for this task was the Grob 115E, designated Tutor T1 by the MoD. The Tutor fleet is owned and maintained by a civilian company, Babcock, and carries British civilian registrations under a Private Finance Initiative (PFI) scheme, painted overall white with blue flashes and UK Military Aircraft roundels.

Royal Navy, Army and RAF Elementary Flying Training (EFT), where students streamed according to ability: Fast Jet, Rotary Wing, Multi-Engine or non-pilot roles, was previously taught on the Grob Tutor at RAF Cranwell and RAF Barkston Heath by the joint 3 Flying Training School, with 703 Naval Air Squadron, 674 Squadron Army Air Corps and 57 RAF Reserve Squadron, before being replaced in 2018 by the turboprop trainer, the Grob G120TP Prefect. Some 3FTS EFT training for various pipelines still continues on the Tutor on 16Sqn at RAF Wittering.

Until 2005 the Tutor was used by UASs to provide EFT to university students, many sponsored by the RAF. From 2006, UAS students are no longer taught EFT; they follow an unassessed flying syllabus similar to EFT, but with only a 36-hour course and the possibility of progression to more advanced training on merit. The Tutor is also used by AEFs to provide flying experience for cadets of the Air Training Corps (ATC) and Combined Cadet Force (CCF), replacing the Bulldog in these roles at the turn of the century. The final AEF to receive the Tutor was 10 AEF, based at RAF Woodvale in Merseyside, in 2001. 10 AEF was incidentally also the last AEF to receive the Bulldog in 1996, replacing the Chipmunk.

Five Tutor T1s are also operated by 727 Naval Air Squadron of the Royal Navy's Fleet Air Arm for trainee pilot grading at RNAS Yeovilton.

In 2009 some Tutor squadrons began to receive new Enhanced Avionics (EA) Tutors, with an updated and enhanced instrument panel, featuring a Garmin GNS 430W GPS system, digital HSI and digital engine instruments. These aircraft are the same as the standard Tutors, with the exception of an extra VHF aerial for the new GPS system and the cockpit modifications.

Operators

 Flight Training Perth - 3 Aircraft
 Royal Aero Club of Western Australia - 3 aircraft
 Flight Training Adelaide – 2 aircraft  
 Australian Flying School – 8 aircraft
 China Southern West Australian Flying College – 38 aircraft (Closed 2021, Aircraft auctioned off.)
 Airspeed Flight School – 4 aircraft  

 Bangladesh Air Force - 3 aircraft.

 Ostende Aviation college – 3 aircraft
 Aeroclub Keiheuvel – 1 aircraft

 Ottawa Aviation Services – 3 aircraft
 Journey Air, Windsor Ontario - 1 aircraft

 Egyptian Air Force – 74 aircraft

 Finnish Air Force – 28 aircraft

 
Kenyan Air Force – 3

 Norwegian Aviation College – 4 aircraft

 Aeronautical Web Academy – 6 aircraft

 United Arab Emirates Air Force – 12 aircraft

 Royal Air Force – 89 aircraft
No. 3 Flying Training School RAF – RAF Cranwell
No. 16 Squadron RAF – RAF Wittering
No. 6 Flying Training School RAF – RAF Cranwell
University of Birmingham Air Squadron – RAF Cosford
 Bristol University Air Squadron – MoD Boscombe Down
Cambridge University Air Squadron – RAF Wittering
 East Midlands Universities Air Squadron – RAF Cranwell
East of Scotland Universities Air Squadron – Leuchars Station
Universities of Glasgow and Strathclyde Air Squadron – Glasgow Airport
Liverpool University Air Squadron – RAF Woodvale
University of London Air Squadron – RAF Wittering
 Manchester and Salford Universities Air Squadron – RAF Woodvale
Northumbrian Universities Air Squadron – RAF Leeming
 Northern Ireland Universities Air Squadron – JHFS Aldergrove
Oxford University Air Squadron – RAF Benson
Southampton University Air Squadron – MoD Boscombe Down
 University of Wales Air Squadron – MoD St Athan
Yorkshire Universities Air Squadron – RAF Linton-on-Ouse
No. 1 Air Experience Flight RAF – MoD St Athan
No. 2 Air Experience Flight RAF – MoD Boscombe Down
No. 3 Air Experience Flight RAF – Colerne Airfield
No. 4 Air Experience Flight RAF – Glasgow Airport
No. 5 Air Experience Flight RAF – RAF Wittering
No. 6 Air Experience Flight RAF – RAF Benson
No. 7 Air Experience Flight RAF – RAF Cranwell
No. 8 Air Experience Flight RAF – RAF Cosford
No. 9 Air Experience Flight RAF – RAF Linton-on-Ouse
No. 10 Air Experience Flight RAF – RAF Woodvale
No. 11 Air Experience Flight RAF – RAF Leeming
No. 12 Air Experience Flight RAF – Leuchars Station
 Royal Navy - 5 aircraft
727 NAS – RNAS Yeovilton - used for Flying Grading
 British Army - unknown
 Army Flying Grading School, Middle Wallop
 Almat Aviation - Withdrawn from service
 Lancashire Aero Club
 Tayside Aviation – 5 aircraft
 Air Midwest - 1 aircraft, Call Sign G-GPSI, Leased through Swift Air

Specifications (G 115E)

Incidents and accidents 
On 29 June 2004, a Tutor lost a propeller blade and its canopy in flight. The aircraft was landed unpowered in a field, where damage was also sustained to the undercarriage. Subsequent investigation revealed cracking in the propeller blade roots across the fleet, which was grounded for modifications. No-one was injured in the incident.
On 11 February 2009, two RAF Tutors operating air experience flights from RAF St Athan collided in mid-air. All four occupants were killed, a pilot and a female Air Training Corps cadet in each aircraft. The two cadets killed were aged 13 and 14, both were members of 1004 (Pontypridd) Squadron Air Training Corps.
In June 2009, a Grob Tutor collided in mid-air with a civilian glider. The two people in the Grob Tutor were killed. The glider pilot parachuted and survived.

See also

References

   Flight Global – Grob Tutor Propeller Issues

External links 

 G115 page on the Grob Aircraft websiteArchived
 Photo of Grob Tutor Cockpit
 The RAF Tutor page
 Grob Tutor G115E Review by Today's Pilot
 airport-data.com
 2013 AAIB Propeller report

1980s German military trainer aircraft
1980s German civil trainer aircraft
Grob aircraft
Single-engined tractor aircraft
Low-wing aircraft
Aircraft first flown in 1985